Thomas Lionel "Tom" Hill (born November 17, 1949, in New Orleans, Louisiana) is an American former athlete, who mainly competed in the 110 metre hurdles.

Competitive career
Hill was among the world's best high hurdlers in the early 1970s and ranked as the number one in the event in the world in 1970.  He was on the June 1970 cover of Track and Field News.  He competed for the United States in the 1972 Summer Olympics held in Munich, Germany, where he won the bronze medal in the men's 110 metre hurdles event.

Hill ran track for Arkansas State University where his best finish at the NCAA Championships was a second place in 1972.  He was the 1970 NCAA Indoor Champion for 60 yard hurdles.

After graduating, Hill completed his ROTC active duty obligation serving as assistant track coach at the United States Military Academy at West Point while still competing in the hurdles.

Hill was inducted into the Arkansas Sports Hall of Fame in 1984.

Rankings

Hill was ranked among the top ten runners in his event in the world  and the extremely competitive US by Track and Field News on numerous occasions and as the world's best high hurdler in 1970:

Post-competitive career
Following his retirement from the sport, Hill has pursued a career in athletic and academic administration.  He earned his Ph.D. in Counselor Education from the University of Florida and served as assistant athletic director at both Tulane University and University of Oklahoma.  He later served as dean of students at Florida before moving to Iowa State University where he served as vice president for Student Affairs.

Hill's son Thomas was an all-star basketball player at Duke University in the 1990s including the 1991 and 1992 NCAA Championship teams.

References

American male hurdlers
Olympic bronze medalists for the United States in track and field
Athletes (track and field) at the 1972 Summer Olympics
Living people
1949 births
Arkansas State University alumni
Track and field athletes from New Orleans
University of Florida alumni
Iowa State University faculty
Medalists at the 1972 Summer Olympics